Benavidez is a surname. Notable people with the surname include:

People
Exequiel Benavídez (born 1989), Argentine football midfielder
Jesse Benavides (born 1963), American former professional boxer
José Benavidez (born 1992), Mexican-American professional boxer in the Light Welterweight division
Joseph Benavidez (born 1984), American mixed martial artist
Nazario Benavídez (1802–1858) Argentine soldier and Governor of San Juan Province
Roy Benavidez (1935–1998), US Army Special Forces soldier and Medal of Honor awardee
Teddy Benavidez, pre World War II Filipino actor who made his film debut in 1936

Fictional characters
Maria Benavidez, fictional character in The Whispers

See also
Benavídez rail disaster, February 1, 1970, Argentina (at least 142 dead and 368 injured)
Charmie Benavidez or Manila by Night, 1980 Filipino Gawad Urian Award-winning drama film
USNS Benavidez (T-AKR-306), Bob Hope-class roll on roll off vehicle cargo ship of the United States Navy
Banavie
Benavides (disambiguation)